Van Loon Glacier is a tributary glacier, 13 kilometres long, draining the eastern slopes of the Bowers Mountains between Rastorguev Glacier and Montigny Glacier. It merges into the larger Graveson Glacier at the east margin of the mountains. It was mapped by the United States Geological Survey (USGS) from surveys and U.S. Navy aerial photography, 1960–62, and was named by the Advisory Committee on Antarctic Names (US-ACAN) for meteorologist Harry van Loon, a member of the Antarctic Weather Central team at Little America on the Ross Ice Shelf 1957–58, who has written numerous scientific papers dealing with Antarctic and southern hemisphere atmospheric research.

Glaciers of Pennell Coast